RSS Stalwart (72) is the fifth ship of the Formidable-class stealth frigate of the Republic of Singapore Navy.

Construction and career 
RSS Stalwart was built by ST Marine Engineering company in Singapore around the late in the 2000s. Stalwart was commissioned on 16 January 2009.

Exercise Malabar 2007 
RSS Formidable participated in Exercise Malabar 07–2 in September 2007, a Theater Security Cooperation engagement involving the navies of the United States, India, Australia, Japan and Singapore. The exercise involved more than 20,000 personnel on 28 ships and 150 aircraft, including the USS Kitty Hawk Carrier Strike Group.

On 16 November 2009, RSS Stalwart was deployed to southern California to support ship/air integration activities. The Republic of Singapore Air Force established its Peace Triton Sikorsky S-70B Seahawk Naval Helicopter detachment at the USN Maritime Strike Weapons School in San Diego, California to undertake qualification and operational training under the umbrella of the USN's SH-60F Aircraft Qualification Course.

Exercise Pelican 2011 
Singapore and Brunei concluded their flagship bilateral naval exercise from 10 to 13 July 2011 which consists of RSS Stalwart, KDB Darulehsan, KDB Syafaat and KDB Itjihad.

CARAT 2011 
RSS Vigour, RSS Stalwart and RSS Supreme conducted a joint exercise with USS Chung-Hoon on 23 August 2011.

Exercise Pelican 2015 
Singapore and Brunei concluded their flagship bilateral naval exercise on 27 November. Exercise Pelican ran from 23 to 27 November 2015, hosted by the Republic of Singapore Navy. The exercise featured RSS Stalwart, RSS Valiant, KDB Darussalam and KDB Darulehsan.

PLAN 70th Anniversary 
On 19 April 2019, RSS Stalwart arrived at Qingdao, China for a multinational naval event.

ADMM-Plus 2019 
RSS Stalwart, KDB Daruttaqwa, HMAS Success, PLAN Xiangtan, INS Kolkata, INS Shakti, KRI Halasan, KRI Tombak, JS Murasame, JS Izumo, KD Lekiu, BRP Andres Bonifacio, MV Avatar, ROKS Cheonjabong, ROKS Jeonbuk, ROKS Wang Geon, HTMS Bhumibol Adulyadej, USS William P. Lawrence and VPNS Quang Trung conducted ADMM-PLUS 2019 off Busan, South Korea. The ships have to conduct an exercise where they need to retake hostile vessels and rescue people overboard at sea. All ships returned to Singapore to conduct check aboard cargo ships.

Gallery

References

Ships of the Republic of Singapore Navy
2005 ships
Formidable-class frigates
Republic of Singapore Navy